Pedro Miguel Neves Santos (born 24 March 1994) is a Portuguese professional footballer who plays for Alverca as a midfielder.

Football career
He made his Taça da Liga debut for Vilafranquense on 28 July 2019 in a game against Casa Pia.

References

External links

1994 births
Living people
People from Caldas da Rainha
Portuguese footballers
Association football midfielders
Liga Portugal 2 players
Campeonato de Portugal (league) players
U.D. Leiria players
S.C.U. Torreense players
SC Vianense players
Leixões S.C. players
U.D. Vilafranquense players
C.D. Cova da Piedade players
F.C. Alverca players
Sportspeople from Leiria District